Darapladib is an inhibitor lipoprotein-associated phospholipase A2 (Lp-PLA2) that is in development as a drug for treatment of atherosclerosis.

It was discovered by Human Genome Sciences in collaboration with GlaxoSmithKline (GSK).

In November 2013, GSK announced that the drug had failed to meet Phase III endpoints in a trial of 16,000 patients with acute coronary syndrome (ACS). An additional trial of 13,000 patients (SOLID-TIMI 52) finished in May 2014. The study failed to reduce the risk of coronary heart disease death, myocardial infarction, and urgent coronary revascularization compared with placebo in acute coronary syndrome patients treated with standard medical care.

References

Drugs acting on the cardiovascular system
Trifluoromethyl compounds
Fluoroarenes
Biphenyls
GSK plc brands
Diethylamino compounds